Erika Jo is the self-titled debut album of country music singer Erika Jo. It was released on June 14, 2005 by Universal South Records, following the artist's win on the 2005 season of Nashville Star. Tim DuBois produced the album with Rick Giles and Sixwire member Steve Mandile on all tracks except "I Break Things", which he co-produced with Tony Brown.

The album debuted at the number 5 spot on the Billboard Top Country Albums chart. Its lead single "I Break Things" reached number 53 on the Hot Country Songs chart, while a cover of Jessi Colter's "I'm Not Lisa" did not chart. The track "Love Is" was co-written by Katrina Elam, who released her own rendition as a single in 2006 from her unreleased second album Turn Me Up.

Track listing

Musicians
Compiled from liner notes.
 Eddie Bayers — drums
 Thom Flora — background vocals
 Paul Franklin — pedal steel guitar, lap steel guitar, Dobro
 Steve Gibson — acoustic guitar
 Aubrey Haynie — fiddle, mandolin
 Wes Hightower — background vocals
 John Barlow Jarvis — piano
 Steve Mandile — acoustic guitar, electric guitar
 Brent Mason — electric guitar
 Steve Nathan — keyboards, Hammond B-3 organ
 Larry Paxton — bass guitar
 Jimmie Lee Sloas — bass guitar
 Harry Stinson — background vocals
 Russell Terrell — background vocals
 Chuck Tilley — percussion

Chart performance

Album

Singles

References

2005 debut albums
Erika Jo albums
Show Dog-Universal Music albums